The chakravala method is a cyclic algorithm to solve indeterminate quadratic equations, including Pell's equation. It is commonly attributed to Bhāskara II, (c. 1114 – 1185 CE) although some attribute it to Jayadeva (c.  950 ~ 1000 CE). Jayadeva pointed out that Brahmagupta's approach to solving equations of this type could be generalized, and he then described this general method, which was later refined by Bhāskara II in his Bijaganita treatise. He called it the Chakravala method: chakra meaning "wheel" in Sanskrit, a reference to the cyclic nature of the algorithm. C.-O. Selenius held that no European performances at the time of Bhāskara, nor much later, exceeded its marvellous height of mathematical complexity.

This method is also known as the cyclic method and contains traces of mathematical induction.

History 
Chakra in Sanskrit means cycle. As per popular legend, Chakravala indicates a mythical range of mountains which orbits around the earth like a wall and not limited by light and darkness.

Brahmagupta in 628 CE studied indeterminate quadratic equations, including Pell's equation

for minimum integers x and y. Brahmagupta could solve it for several N, but not all.

Jayadeva (9th century) and Bhaskara (12th century) offered the first complete solution to the equation, using the chakravala method to find for  the solution

This case was notorious for its difficulty, and was first solved in Europe by Brouncker in 1657–58 in response to a challenge by Fermat, using continued fractions. A method for the general problem was first completely described rigorously by Lagrange in 1766. Lagrange's method, however, requires the calculation of 21 successive convergents of the continued fraction for the square root of 61, while the chakravala method is much simpler. Selenius, in his assessment of the chakravala method, states

"The method represents a best approximation algorithm of minimal length that, owing to several minimization properties, with minimal effort and avoiding large numbers automatically produces the best solutions to the equation. The chakravala method anticipated the European methods by more than a thousand years. But no European performances in the whole field of algebra at a time much later than Bhaskara's, nay nearly equal up to our times, equalled the marvellous complexity and ingenuity of chakravala."

Hermann Hankel calls the chakravala method
"the finest thing achieved in the theory of numbers before Lagrange."

The method
From Brahmagupta's identity, we observe that for given N,

For the equation , this allows the "composition" (samāsa) of two solution triples  and  into a new triple

In the general method, the main idea is that any triple  (that is, one which satisfies ) can be composed with the trivial triple  to get the new triple  for any m.

Since the signs inside the squares do not matter, the following substitutions are possible:

When a positive integer m is chosen so that (a + bm)/k is an integer, so are the other two numbers in the triple. Among such m, the method chooses one that minimizes the absolute value of m2 − N and hence that of (m2 − N)/k. Then the substitution relations are applied for m equal to the chosen value. This results in a new triple (a, b, k). This method always terminates with a solution (proved by Lagrange in 1768).
Optionally, we can stop when k is ±1, ±2, or ±4, as Brahmagupta's approach gives a solution for those cases.

Brahmagupta's composition method 

k = -1 
Using Brahmagupta's identity, to compose the triple  with itself:

  

Substituting  to get the solution:

k = ±2 
Again using the equation, 

Substituting ,

Substituting ,

k = 4 
Substituting  into the equation  creates the triple .

Which is a solution if  is even:

Composing the triples gives 

When  is odd,

k = -4 
When , then . Composing with itself yields .

Again composing itself yields  

. 

This give us the solutions

(Note,  is useful to find a solution to Pell's Equation, but it is not always the smallest integer pair. e.g. .

Examples

n = 61
The n = 61 case (determining an integer solution satisfying ), issued as a challenge by Fermat many centuries later, was given by Bhaskara as an example.

We start with a solution  for any k found by any means. In this case we can let b be 1, thus, since , we have the triple . Composing it with  gives the triple , which is scaled down (or Bhaskara's lemma is directly used) to get:
 

Now that k is −4, we can use Brahmagupta's idea: it can be scaled down to the rational solution , which composed with itself three times, with  respectively, when k becomes square and scaling can be applied, this gives . Finally, such procedure can be repeated until the solution is found (requiring 9 additional self-compositions and 4 additional square-scalings): . This is the minimal integer solution.

n = 67
Suppose we are to solve  for x and y.

We start with a solution  for any k found by any means; in this case we can let b be 1, thus producing . At each step, we find an m > 0 such that k divides a + bm, and |m2 − 67| is minimal.

First iteration
We have . We want a positive integer m such that k divides a + bm, i.e. 3 divides 8 + m, and |m2 − 67| is minimal. The first condition implies that m is of the form 3t + 1 (i.e. 1, 4, 7, 10,… etc.), and among such m, the minimal value is attained for m = 7. That is, we have the new solution:
 

At this point, one round of the cyclic algorithm is complete.

Second iteration
We now repeat the process. We have . We want an m > 0 such that k divides a + bm, i.e. 6 divides 41 + 5m, and |m2 − 67| is minimal. The first condition implies that m is of the form 6t + 5 (i.e. 5, 11, 17,… etc.), and among such m, |m2 − 67| is minimal for m = 5. This leads to the new solution a = (41⋅5 + 67⋅5)/6, etc.:

Third iteration
For 7 to divide 90 + 11m, we must have m = 2 + 7t (i.e. 2, 9, 16,… etc.) and among such m, we pick m = 9.

Final solution
At this point, we could continue with the cyclic method (and it would end, after seven iterations), but since the right-hand side is among ±1, ±2, ±4, we can also use Brahmagupta's observation directly. Composing the triple (221, 27, −2) with itself, we get

that is, we have the integer solution:

Notes

References
Florian Cajori (1918), Origin of the Name "Mathematical Induction", The American Mathematical Monthly 25 (5), p. 197-201.
George Gheverghese Joseph, The Crest of the Peacock: Non-European Roots of Mathematics (1975).
G. R. Kaye, "Indian Mathematics", Isis 2:2 (1919), p. 326–356.
Clas-Olaf Selenius, "Rationale of the chakravala process of Jayadeva and Bhaskara II", Historia Mathematica 2 (1975), pp. 167–184.
Clas-Olaf Selenius, "Kettenbruchtheoretische Erklärung der zyklischen Methode zur Lösung der Bhaskara-Pell-Gleichung", Acta Acad. Abo. Math. Phys. 23 (10) (1963), pp. 1–44.
Hoiberg, Dale & Ramchandani, Indu (2000). Students' Britannica India. Mumbai: Popular Prakashan. 
Goonatilake, Susantha (1998). Toward a Global Science: Mining Civilizational Knowledge. Indiana: Indiana University Press. .
Kumar, Narendra (2004). Science in Ancient India. Delhi: Anmol Publications Pvt Ltd. 
Ploker, Kim (2007) "Mathematics in India". The Mathematics of Egypt, Mesopotamia, China, India, and Islam: A Sourcebook New Jersey: Princeton University Press.

External links
Introduction to chakravala

Brahmagupta
Diophantine equations
Number theoretic algorithms
Indian mathematics